2111 Tselina is a stony Eos asteroid from the outer regions of the asteroid belt. It was discovered on 13 June 1969, by Soviet astronomer Tamara Smirnova at Crimean Astrophysical Observatory in Nauchnij, on the Crimean peninsula. It was later named after the Soviet Virgin Lands Campaign.

Orbit and classification 
 
Tselina is a member of the Eos family, the largest asteroid family in the outer main belt consisting of nearly 10,000 asteroids. It orbits the Sun at a distance of 2.7–3.3 AU once every 5 years and 3 months (1,914 days). Its orbit has an eccentricity of 0.10 and an inclination of 11° with respect to the ecliptic. The body's observation arc begins at the discovering observatory in 1968, or one year prior to its official discovery.

Naming 

This minor planet was named after the tselina lands to commemorate the 25th anniversary of the Soviet Virgin Lands Campaign. The campaign was launched by Nikita Khrushchev in 1953, with the intention to significantly increase the agricultural production in the USSR. The word "tselina" (or tseliny) means "virgin soil". The official naming citation was published by the Minor Planet Center on 1 April 1980.

Physical characteristics 

In the Tholen classification, Tselina is a common, stony S-type asteroid.

Rotation period 

In September 2001, a rotational lightcurve of Tselina was obtained from photometric observations by French amateur astronomer Laurent Bernasconi. Lightcurve analysis gave a well-defined rotation period of  hours with a brightness variation of 0.17 magnitude. In September 2012, observations by astronomers at the Palomar Transient Factory, California, gave a concurring period of  hours with an amplitude of 0.29 magnitude.

Diameter and albedo 

According to the surveys carried out by the Infrared Astronomical Satellite IRAS, the Japanese Akari satellite, and NASA's Wide-field Infrared Survey Explorer with its subsequent NEOWISE mission, Tselina measures between 22.773 and 33.02 kilometers in diameter and its surface has an albedo between 0.13 and 0.226. The Collaborative Asteroid Lightcurve Link agrees with the results obtained by IRAS, that is, an albedo of 0.1938 and a diameter of 24.54 kilometers with an absolute magnitude of 10.45.

References

External links 

 Lightcurve Database Query (LCDB), at www.minorplanet.info
 Dictionary of Minor Planet Names, Google books
 Asteroids and comets rotation curves, CdR – Geneva Observatory, Raoul Behrend
 Discovery Circumstances: Numbered Minor Planets (1)-(5000) – Minor Planet Center
 
 

002111
Discoveries by Tamara Mikhaylovna Smirnova
Named minor planets
002111
19690613